Stephen 'Steve' Collins (born 8 June 1966 in Manchester, England) is a former Speedway rider.

Family
Steve has four brothers all of whom were speedway riders, Peter, Les, Neil and Phil. His nephews Aidan and Chris were also riders but have both retired from the sport.

External links
Aidan Collins Website

References 

Living people
1966 births
British speedway riders
English motorcycle racers
Sportspeople from Manchester
Cradley Heathens riders
Birmingham Brummies riders
Lakeside Hammers riders